The Louisiana Tech Bulldogs baseball team represents Louisiana Tech University in NCAA Division I college baseball. The Louisiana Tech baseball team participates in Conference USA. The Bulldogs play their home games on campus at J. C. Love Field at Pat Patterson Park.

History

Conference affiliations
 1940–1948: Louisiana Intercollegiate Conference
 1949–1971: Gulf States Conference
 1972–1987: Southland Conference
 1988–1991: American South Conference
 1992–2001: Sun Belt Conference
 2002–2013: Western Athletic Conference
 2014–present: Conference USA

Championships

Conference regular season championships

Conference division championships

Conference championship series championships

Conference tournament championships

NCAA Regional results

Stadiums

J. C. Love Field at Pat Patterson Park

Year-by-Year results

Head coaches

Head coaching records

Conference Coach of the Year
 Berry Hinton: 6 times
 Pat Patterson: 7 times
 Wade Simoneaux: 2007

Players

Honors
WAC Player of the Year
 Brian Rike, 2007

Sun Belt Conference Player of the Year
 T. J. Soto, 1997

College World Series Home Run Derby Champion
 T. J. Soto, 2000

MLB Draft
Louisiana Tech has had 74 Major League Baseball Draft selections since the draft began in 1965.

Olympians

Former players

Others:
 Jim Case
 Berry Hinton
 Rick Huckabay
 David Lee
 Jackie Moreland
 Pat Patterson
 Scotty Robertson

See also
List of NCAA Division I baseball programs

References

External links